Bulgarians in Spain (Ispania) are one of the largest communities of the Bulgarian diaspora. According to official 2019 data, they numbered 197,373, making them the tenth-largest emigrant community in Spain and the second-largest among Central and Eastern European emigrant communities.

History
The bulk of Bulgarians in Spain consists of recent economic immigrants. Until recent years, Bulgarian emigration to Spain was scarce and unorganized. According to historian Ivan Dimitrov, an unknown number of Bulgarians fled to Spain after the Ottoman conquest of the Second Bulgarian Empire in the late 14th or early 15th century. Dimitrov claims that around 300 families in Spain retain memories of their Bulgarian origin from that period. Among Bulgarians are Banat Bulgarians from Romania, Aromanians and Megleno-Romanians who became adjusted to Spanish society because of the linguistic similarities between Romanian, Aromanian, Megleno-Romanian, and Spanish, as well as Latin identity of Aromanians and Megleno-Romanians, and Banat Bulgarians are predominantly Roman Catholic.

With the upsurge of Bulgarian economy in the 18th and 19th centuries, individual Bulgarian merchants reached the markets of Spain, though a colony was never formed even after the Liberation of Bulgaria in 1878. Only after World War I did Bulgarian gardeners reach Spain and Catalonia specifically. According to a 1930 statistic, 88 Bulgarian gardeners worked in Spain. However, the Spanish Civil War of 1936–39 and World War II that followed hindered the formation of a gardening colony.

After World War II, a small number of Bulgarian political emigrants fleeing the communist regime settled in Spain. Among those emigrants was a large part of the Bulgarian royal family, including the deposed child monarch Tsar Simeon II of Saxe-Coburg-Gotha, who was granted asylum by Francisco Franco in 1951. Simeon II lived in Spain for 50 years, until his return to Bulgaria in 2001.

Around 1998, the number of Bulgarians in Spain was only around 3,000. By 2002, around 10,000 people had been officially registered as legal Bulgarian emigrants, though the number of illegal immigrants was thought to be much larger. In the early 21st century, substantial Bulgarian communities were formed in Madrid, Barcelona, Málaga, San Sebastián, Valladolid, Palma de Mallorca and other cities.

Foreign population of Bulgarian citizenship in Spain 
Bulgarian citizens living in Spain include ethnic Bulgarians as well as minority groups (including Turks, Pomaks, Armenians etc.).

Notable people
Mariana Gurkova
Romano Kristoff

See also 
 Bulgaria–Spain relations

References

Notes

Sources

External links
Bulgarian embassy in Spain 
List of Bulgarian organizations in Spain by the Agency for Bulgarians Abroad 
Bulgarian orthodox parish of the Nativity of the Mother of God in Barcelona 

 

Ethnic groups in Spain
Spain